Aïn El Kébira District is a district of Sétif Province, Algeria.

Communes 
The District is composed of three communes: Aïn El Kébira, Dehamcha and ouled Addouane.

Districts of Sétif Province